Casey Patton (born November 21, 1974 in London, Ontario) is a retired boxer from Canada.  He is a five time Canadian champion who competed in the featherweight (< 57 kg) division at the 1996 Summer Olympics in Atlanta, Georgia. There he was defeated in the first round by South Africa's Phillip N'dou in a controversial referee stoppage.

Patton won the gold medal in the 1994 Commonwealth Games in Victoria, British Columbia and was the 1994 Canadian Amateur Boxer of the year. In 2008, Patton was inducted into the London (Ontario) Sports Hall of Fame.

External links
 
 
 
 
 

1974 births
Living people
Canadian male boxers
Featherweight boxers
Olympic boxers of Canada
Boxers at the 1996 Summer Olympics
Commonwealth Games gold medallists for Canada
Commonwealth Games medallists in boxing
Boxers at the 1994 Commonwealth Games
Sportspeople from London, Ontario
Boxing people from Ontario
Medallists at the 1994 Commonwealth Games